Alejandro Albor (born January 13, 1964) is an American cyclist who won a silver medal at the 2004 Summer Paralympics in Athens, Greece and a silver and bronze medal at the 2008 Summer Paralympics in Beijing, China.

Albor was born in Tzintzimeo, a town in the state of Michoacán in Mexico. When he was 15 years old he and his family relocated to the United States. He lost his legs below the knee at the age of 18, when a car he was driving crashed into a moving train. Albor now owns and runs A-WON HandCycles, a business which builds handcycles. He is married and has three children.

References

External links
 . 
 
 Alejandro Albor on Fox 11 News video at YouTube

1964 births
Living people
American male cyclists
Paralympic cyclists of the United States
Paralympic silver medalists for the United States
Paralympic bronze medalists for the United States
Cyclists at the 2004 Summer Paralympics
Cyclists at the 2008 Summer Paralympics
Medalists at the 2004 Summer Paralympics
Medalists at the 2008 Summer Paralympics
Paralympic medalists in cycling
20th-century American people
21st-century American people